Antso Rakotondramanga (born 14 July 1988) is a Malagasy tennis player who was born in Paris, France.

Rakotondramanga has a career high ATP singles ranking of 1009 achieved on 29 April 2013. He also has a career high ATP doubles ranking of 734 achieved on 4 November 2013.

Rakotondramanga represents Madagascar at the Davis Cup where he has a W/L record of 27–19. Rakotondramanga also earned himself a silver medal in the Men's Singles at the 2013 Summer Universiade. Rakotondramanga also competed in the Men's Doubles at the same games with V. Rakotondramanga.

References

External links
 
 
 

1988 births
Living people
Malagasy tennis players
Universiade medalists in tennis
Tennis players from Paris
Malagasy people of French descent
Universiade medalists for Madagascar
Medalists at the 2013 Summer Universiade